Dan Fogelberg Live: Greetings from the West is a live album by American singer-songwriter Dan Fogelberg, released in 1991 (see 1991 in music). The album was recorded on June 25, 1991 at the Fox Theater, St. Louis, Missouri, United States.

Track listing
All songs written by Dan Fogelberg, except where noted.

Disc one
"Aurora Nova" – 1:43
"The Wild Places" – 4:26
"Heart Hotels" – 4:18
"Over and Over" – 5:16
"Rhythm of the Rain" (John Gummoe) – 5:50
"The Spirit Trail" – 6:49
"Make Love Stay" – 5:56
"Old Tennessee" – 3:30
"Road Beneath My Wheels" – 6:54
"A Cry in the Forest" – 5:42
"Run for the Roses" – 5:25
"Believe in Me" – 4:01
"Leader of the Band" – 5:29

Disc two
"Twins Theme" – 2:41
"Intimidation" – 3:24
"The Power of Gold" – 8:57
"Lonely in Love" – 5:55
"Missing You" – 5:21
"Language of Love" – 3:55
"Part of the Plan" – 4:18
"Same Old Lang Syne" – 6:24
"There's a Place in the World for a Gambler" – 8:12

Personnel 
 Dan Fogelberg – lead vocals, keyboards, guitars
 Vince Melamed – keyboards, backing vocals
 Robert McEntee – keyboards, guitars, backing vocals
 Louis Cortelezzi – keyboards, percussion, flute, saxophone, woodwinds
 Jim Photoglo – bass, backing vocals
 Mike Botts – drums, percussion 
 Tim Weisberg – flute

Production 
 Dan Fogelberg – producer, mixing 
 Marty Lewis – producer, recording 
 David Hewitt – recording, mixing 
 John Hurley – mix assistant 
 Carlos Grier – digital editing
 Denny Purcell – mastering at Georgetown Masters (Nashville, Tennessee)
 Henry Diltz – photography

References

Dan Fogelberg albums
1991 live albums